Franc Cvenkelj (1 May 1925 – 27 May 1997) was a Slovenian alpine skier. He competed in three events at the 1956 Winter Olympics, representing Yugoslavia.

References

1925 births
1997 deaths
Slovenian male alpine skiers
Olympic alpine skiers of Yugoslavia
Alpine skiers at the 1956 Winter Olympics
People from Tržič